The 1946 Australia rugby union tour of New Zealand was a series of rugby union games undertaken by the Australia team in New Zealand against invitational and national teams of New Zealand. It was the first rugby union international tour after the Second World War.

New Zealand won all three test matches to retain the Bledisloe Cup

Tour match 
Scores and results list Australia's points tally first.

Sources

Australia national rugby union team tours of New Zealand
Australia Rugby Union
New Zealand Rugby Union